Paolo Francia (born 1901 – year of death unknown) was an Italian Olympic biathlete.

In the rank of an alpino (soldier E-1 of the Alpini corps), he was member of the Italian military patrol at the 1924 Winter Olympics in Chamonix led by Second lieutenant Piero Dente. The team was one of two withdrawing to bad weather conditions.

External links 
 Paolo Francia, sports-reference.com

References

Italian military patrol (sport) runners
Olympic biathletes of Italy
Military patrol competitors at the 1924 Winter Olympics
Italian soldiers
Alpini
1901 births
Year of death missing